The Round Table Family organisation is a group of social networking and charitable clubs that together form a worldwide movement of tens of thousands of people.

Round Table

Founded in 1927. Open to men aged 18-45 in Great Britain and Ireland (18-40 in most of the world). All the National Round Table Clubs across the world and are part of Round Table International.

Ladies Circle

Founded in 1932. Open to women aged 18-45. Ladies Circle is a social networking organisation for young women aged between 18 and 45, founded in 1932. It aims to promote friendship through social contact at local, national and international level and to be of service to the community. For many years Circlers were the wives or partners of members of Round Table, but in 1993 the rules were changed and Ladies' Circle is now open to any woman in the age range 18 - 45, and whilst Ladies' Circle work very closely with Round Table on many issues, both business and social, they are a totally independent organisation. All the National Ladies Circle Clubs across the world and are part of Ladies Circle International.

41 Club

Founded in 1945. Open to current or former Round Tablers over 40. The full name is "The Association of Ex-Round Tablers’ Clubs". This club specialises in continuing the friendships made in Round Table. The philosophy of the club is very similar to that of Round Table, but it is often less ‘active’ and in many cases clubs meet less often. The Club's main purpose is to support Round Table and, if possible, participate in local community service initiatives or charity work. However the ‘continued friendship’ and ‘fellowship’ aspect is of great importance. Most clubs meet monthly, often in a public house, golf club or restaurant. Meetings are usually semi-formal with either an activity or a speaker to entertain. Lifelong friendships are often made in 41 Club. To join 41 Club it is a requirement to be a present or former member of Round Table. All the National 41 Clubs across the world and are part of 41 International

Tangent

Founded 1953. Open to women over 40, the National Association of Tangent Clubs is an organisation for women, mainly aged over 40, (Open to Woman over 45 in Great Britain and Ireland) with a focus on making friends and enjoying a programme of interesting fellowship activities and supporting local and national service projects and causes through fundraising events. All the National Tangent Clubs across the world are part of Tangent Club International.

Agora
Founded 1987. Open to women over 42 if they were not Circlers before and over 45 if they were Circlers before. All the National Agora clubs across the world are part of Agora Club International.

Related clubs 
 Table Plus. Part of the 41 Club. Open to men aged 45-60.
 Tangle. Part of Tangent. Open to women aged 45-60.
 Agora Club International

References

External links
 Round Table
 Round Table International
 Ladies Circle - The National Association of Ladies Circles of Great Britain and Ireland
 Ladies Circle International
 41 Club - The Association of Ex-Round Tablers' Clubs
 41 Club International
 Tangent club international
 Agora Club International

Clubs and societies in the United Kingdom